Torres is an Italian football club based in the city of Sassari. It plays in Serie C, the third division of the Italian football league system.

Re-founded in 2017, the club is the continuation of the Società per l'Educazione Fisica Torres, born in 1903 and reconstituted thrice throughout its history. Together with Ilvamaddalena, it is the oldest football club in Sardinia.

The highest division it took part in was the third tier. It played thirty seasons, making Sassari the most populous city in Italy that has never had a team in Serie B. Its best result in the third tier is the third place, while it has won Serie C2 twice, in 1986-1987 and 1999–2000.

The club colours are red and blue. It plays its home matches at the Stadio Vanni Sanna.

History

Beginnings 

Torres was founded on 19 April 1903 as Società per l'Educazione Fisica Torres (Torres Physical Education Society) and starts its sporting activity the 1 July. On 20 September 1903, the Torres players made their public debut with a gymnastic recital held in the Verdi Theatre in Sassari. The club soon distinguished itself as one of the most active at the regional level in various disciplines, achieving outstanding results even at a national level. The first away game played by Torres dates back to 19 April 1908 when the rossoblù faced in Ajaccio the local team, a game played in Piazza Diamante. As for football, after eight years of amateur activity, a special section was founded in 1911. Torres won the first edition of the Sardinian football championships the same year. In addition to Torres, two other teams from Sassari, Iosto and Club Sportivo, and one from Cagliari, Amsicora, participated in the championship. At La Maddalena, in the summer of 1912, Torres won the Coppa Città della Maddalena, first beating Ilva 7-0 and, in the final, the Marina 3–1. The inter-war period was a phase of little sporting activity, which resumed with more continuity in the 1920s.

The 1920s and 1930s: First local derbies and the first promotion 

On 8 September 1920, Sardinia's two leading clubs played in Cagliari at the Stallaggio Meloni. Surprisingly, Cagliari won 5–2. On 27 May 1922, in the presence of Prince Umberto di Savoia, the Stadio Acquedotto, still the stadium of Torres, was inaugurated. On 4 November 1924, another historic derby was played for the first time, that between Torres and the then Terranovese to celebrate the 21st anniversary of Torres. The Sassaresi won 2-1 The game between Olbia and Torres, known as the Derby del Nord Sardegna, is the most played derby on the island, with more than 100 matches. It is a fierce rivalry between both fans. After the first few years of friendly activity, they entered the Terza Divisione in 1927–1928, finishing runners-up behind Cagliari and ahead of Monteponi Iglesias and Avanguardia Giovanile Fascista of Cagliari.

In the 1930–1931 season, participated in a regional championship (with the Lazio Regional Directorate because the Sardinian one could not organise it), resulting in a promotion to the Prima Divisione (the third tier at the time). In the 1931-1932 championship, the Sassaresi, led by the Hungarian Ferenc Plemich, came close to promotion to Serie B.

The following season was less positive, finishing second to last and relegated, but still being readmitted to the third tier. In 1934-35 it finished mid-table but renounced to play the next championship and played friendly matches until 1939. In 1939-40 they finished fifth in the Sardinian First Division, which corresponded to the fourth national level.

Post Second World War period 
In the first part of the 1940s, Torres played in the Sardinian First Division without great results; the best position was third place in 1942–43. Due to the war, the championships were suspended the following year until 1944–45. In 1946–47, despite finishing fourth, the club was admitted to Serie C. A friendly against Juventus was played to celebrate this event on 5 June 1947 at the Stadio Acquedotto, with Juventus winning 3–1. The following season, however, the team was relegated back to the First Division, almost missing out on promotion in 1949–50. They won the group A but finished only third in the final round.

In 1950-51 Torres won the Sardinian First Division and entered the newly formed fourth division. It remained until 1958-59 when it won the championship and was promoted to the Serie C. In the third national division, it disputes mid-table championships but was awarded the CONI Stella d'oro al merito sportivo (Golden Star for sporting merit). It was relegated again in 1970–71 to Serie D but returned to the third division in 1971–72. It was relegated again in 1974–75. In 1980-81 they won another Serie D championship, being promoted to the newly formed Serie C2, corresponding to the fourth level. In 1982 it changed its name to Torres Calcio s.r.l. Dragged along by the experience of Mario Piga, back in the red and blue after a brilliant career at the highest level, and the rising star Gianfranco Zola, in 1986–87, the club, coached by Lamberto Leonardi, won the championship and gained promotion to Serie C1. This was the standard formation: Pinna, Tamponi, Poggi, Petrella, Cariola, Del Favero, Tolu, Zola, Galli, Piga, Ennis. At the end of the following season, they finished ahead of rivals Cagliari. At the same time, in the 1988–1989 season, Torres reached the fourth-place finish just a step away from Serie B, behind rivals Cagliari (winners of the tournament), Foggia and Palermo.

The first bankruptcy and the rebirth 
In 1990–1991, following relegation on the field to Serie C2, came exclusion for financial defaults. In the 1991–1992 season, the club entered the Interregional Championship. Under the presidency of Corrado Sanna, Torres finished 5th and won the Coppa Italia Dilettanti (Interregional Phase). In the summer of 1992, the club was re-founded, retaining the sporting title and the Interregional category but changing its name to Polisportiva Sassari Torres. In 1992-1993 Torres, taken over by the building entrepreneur Gianni Marrosu and coached by Giuseppe 'Eppe' Zolo, immediately achieved a return to the professional ranks, thanks to a 2–1 victory (goals by Antonio Podda and Renato Greco) in the play-off against L'Aquila, played at the Stadio Flaminio in Rome in front of over three thousand torresini fans.

After many Serie C2 championships and some unsuccessful attempts at corporate changeovers, in the 1999–2000 season, Torres was bought by a group of businessmen from Sassari, who entrusted the presidency to Leonardo Marras. The team, led again by Leonardi, regained promotion to Serie C1, thanks also to the goals of former Panionios Greek forward Theofilos Karasavvidīs, who scored 19 goals in 32 matches. In the 2000–2001 season in Serie C1, Torres had a good championship as newly promoted, placing 7th. Among the most important results, it is necessary to remember the 3–0 home victories against Catania and Palermo and 2–0 against Messina.

Initially excluded from the 2005-2006 championship, the club gained registration thanks to an order of the administrative judge and, led by Antonello Cuccureddu, managed to reach the playoffs for promotion to Serie B. On 16 May 2006, Torres was involuntarily involved in the Calciopoli investigation when telephone interceptions were published between the then Minister of the Interior, Beppe Pisanu and the Juventus manager Luciano Moggi. The team suffered the backlash, being defeated in the semifinals in the double-header by Grosseto, losing both games 1–0.

Exclusions in 2006 and 2008 
The defeat was followed by exclusion from the championship due to the club's serious financial collapse because of debts accrued under the management of president Rinaldo Carta. In the 2006-2007 championship, with the new name of Sassari Torres 1903 and under the presidency of Sassari entrepreneur Antonio Mascia, the club obtained admission to Serie C2 in extremis, thanks to the Lodo Petrucci. The team, built in just a few weeks during the summer, struggled due to poor pre-season preparation and the club's inexperience. The tournament fell short of expectations, alternating good play and victories with discouraging results. In fact, in April, the coach Maurizio Costantini was exonerated. However, the team won salvation and avoided the play-outs. In the 2007–2008 season, still in the Serie C2 group A, under the guidance of Luciano Foschi, Torres played a first leg that ended at the top of the league table and with a record sequence of nine consecutive home victories. However, a crisis of results and an eight-point penalty for administrative irregularities during the failed Mascia management plunged the team into the play-out zone, but the team avoided relegation.

In the summer of 2008, the federal control bodies ordered the club's exclusion from Serie C2 again for financial reasons. The appeal to the Lazio Regional Administrative Court against this decision was rejected, as was the request to the Council of State on 27 August. Torres was condemned to exclusion from the professional championships and thus restarted from the Sardinian Promozione championship with a new club chaired by Leonardo Marras, former president in 1999 and patron of Torres Femminile. Former red-blue bomber Roberto Ennas has been chosen as a manager. Amarcord of the eighties, also in the club's name: Torres Calcio.

After winning the 2008-2009 Sardinian Promozione (second tier), under the direction of Roberto Ennas, Torres gained promotion to Eccellenza.

On 27 September 2010, the club exonerated the coach for the bad results at the beginning of the season. It appointed a new coach Angelino Fiori. On 17 January 2011, the club dismissed Fiori; Ennas returned to the team's bench the next day. On 27 February 2011, after the 3–1 defeat suffered in Tortolì, Ennas resigned from the post. The club was then assigned to Guglielmo Bacci, who finished runners-up in the standings and participated in the playoffs as the top seed. After winning the regional phase, they entered the national playoff phase. In the semi-final of the national stage of the playoffs for promotion to Serie D, Torres met the Umbrian club of Trestina, from which it was eliminated.

The following season was triumphant, winning all the titles with record numbers (28 wins out of 34 matches played, 12 consecutive victories, 28 consecutive results without losing, 17 wins out of 17 games played at home). On 25 January 2012 came the first trophy, the Sardinian Cup, with a 2–1 victory over Taloro Gavoi, defending champions of the 2011 trophy. On 18 March 2012, beating Calangianus 1–0, the Torres returned to Serie D mathematically four days in advance. Finally, on 20 May 2012, the rossoblù closed the season by winning the Sardinian Supercup, imposing 2–1 on Fonni.

During the following summer, the club was largely renewed with good elements from different clubs on the island. To the general surprise, it was at the top of the Serie D championship standings for almost the entire season. The team's top scorer is Giuseppe Meloni, a striker from Nuoro with experience in Lega Pro, who scores a total of 21 goals. On 28 April 2013, drawing 4–4 with Hyria Nola and Casertana losing to Torre Neapolis, he returned to the Second Division.

In June, President Lorenzoni denounced that registration for the Lega Pro Seconda Divisione was at risk, due to difficulties in obtaining the necessary bank guarantee, and subsequently resigned. A committee of fans announced Operation Fundraising whose guarantor was the lawyer Umberto Carboni from Sassari, who is in charge of collecting and guarding the money received. The operation was successful, and around €110,000 was raised in a week. On 27 June, Torres shares officially passed into the hands of Lazio entrepreneur Domenico Capitani. He became the new owner of the Sassari club. He is joined by the new Sardinian partner Antonio Filippo Salaris. The 2013-14 Lega Pro Seconda Divisione started disastrously.
For this reason, and also due to the fans' protest, the club exonerated coach Salvo Fulvio D'Adderio. Lazio's Marco Cari replaced him. The team was completely renewed during the winter market and placed 12th, which still ensured participation in the play-outs. In the double-header against Forlì they won 1–0 in the first leg but lost 3–0 in the return match in Romagna. On 25 May 2014 Torres was relegated in Serie D, however, on 1 August 2014, the club was readmitted in the new Lega Pro.

In the 2014–2015 season the club incorporated A.S.D. Torres (the city's women's team), one of the most important Italian female clubs with 7 Scudetti, 8 Coppe Italia and 7 Italian Super Cups in its palmarès, before it was excluded from the championship for financial defaults, and reborn the following season with a separate entity from the men's team. In the Lega Pro Torres avoided relegation on the field with two days to go before the end of the championship. Still, on 29 August 2015 the FIGC's Corte d'Appello Federale relegated it to Serie D for sports offences.

In the 2015-16 Serie D Torres reached the play-offs. In the semifinals it draws 1–1 in extra time with Rieti. It enters the final by the best placement in the standings at the end of the league (3rd). On 29 May 2016, they lost at home 0–1 against Olbia in the play-off final for the repechage to Lega Pro.

In the 2016–2017 season, the financial situation was problematic. However, the entry of Salvatore Sechi in the club, with the new sports director Vittorio Tossi, completely renewed the team to try to save the category. Still, despite all the efforts, the Sassaresi relegated to the top regional division. Due to huge financial problems, the club was put into liquidation and went bankrupt. The club did not enter the Sardinia.

The fourth re-foundation and the ascent to Serie C 
The new president Salvatore Sechi tried to relaunch the Sassari sporting legacy by taking the reins of the Tergu Plubium, a team of excellence born from the merger of the towns of Tergu and Ploaghe. In the presentation of the new club, the new logo was unveiled, identical to the previous one but with the wording Torres Calcio. Still, federal regulations prohibited the transfer of the sport's title due to the previous merger between the two teams from the province of Sassari and the sporting offences of the old S.E.F. Torres. The legacy of S.E.F. is therefore continued by Sechi with the former Tergu Plubium, even though that club does not possess the sporting title of the predecessor Torres club. On 2 August 2017 came the confirmation of the change of name of the A.S.D. F.C. Tergu Plubium to A.S.D. Torres, with the consequent relocation of the playing field for home matches to the Stadio Vanni Sanna, with consequent dispensation from the FIGC as it is not located in the territory of the municipality of Tergu. Consequently, the club's social colours also changed from white-blue to Torresino red-blue. The new club finished third, followed by the victory in the regional playoffs with consequent admission to the national disputes for promotion to Serie D, which are won, ensuring the team promotion. The management Sechi provides stability but is fluctuating in terms of results: in the first season, the team avoided relegation only at the play-out in the derby with Castiadas, while the following year, after a good championship, interrupted only by the pandemic of COVID-19, it finished third. In 2020–2021, the team started among the favourites. Still, the performances are mediocre, and the team only manages to save the category at best.

The turning point came in the summer of 2021 when the Sardinian company Abinsula Srl bought the club. The new president became the former flagman of the 1990s, Stefano Udassi, who immediately set up a team to return to Serie C. The expectations are confirmed, and only Giugliano denies the conquest of direct promotion. Even in the Coppa Italia Dilettanti, the path was excellent. The victory faded only in the final loss in Genzano di Roma against Follonica Gavorrano. The third place in the championship guarantees participation in the play-off for the repechage list. After the semi-final with Arzachena, the red and blue, on 8 June 2022, beat Afragolese at home in the final, thus guaranteeing the second slot of the potential admitted in the third series. In this perspective, the extra-football corporate operations in July, such as the renovation of parts of the Stadio Vanni Sanna and the transformation from Associazione Sportiva Dilettantistica to a limited liability company, thus changing its name to Torres Srl, had an impact.
On 3 August 2022, following Campobasso and Teramo's exclusion for financial defaults from Serie C, the Sassaresi obtained the official repechage to Serie C, thus returning to the professional ranks after eight seasons of absence.

Colours, badge and identity

Name 
The choice of the name Torres is due to one of the club's founders, Professor Berlinguer. Judicate of Logudoro or Torres was the medieval Sardinian Judicates in which Sassari was located in the north-western part of island. At the beginning of the 20th century, several Sardinian football clubs and sports associations chose names that recalled Sardinian history. It was due to a rediscovery of local identity that also took place through naming historical names.

Colours 
The club's official colours are red and blue, following a survey by the founding members. They, looking for a gala suit, put three on display in a well-known city shop. What met with great success was a blue double-breasted jacket with red lapels.

The classic Torres uniform is the one commonly - but improperly - known as the red and blue quartered shirt: red on the right and blue on the left, with the sleeves, generally reversed, i.e. red on the left and blue on the right. On the left side, at heart, is the club's coat of arms, which for a long time was represented by a white shield with the heraldic coat of arms of the city of Sassari. Rarely this historical combination has undergone variations. In the 1977–1978 season, the two parts of the uniform were separated diagonally. In the 1980s, the uniform often had a single colour, red or blue, with trim in the opposite colour on the shoulders and above the heart. At the time, another jersey was also used, with red and blue vertical stripes. Particularly the uniform used in the 1997-1998 Serie C2, blue with a red vertical stripe running through the centre of the shirt, edged in white. This uniform is reminiscent of the classic combination of the French club Paris Saint-Germain. The classic second uniform is white with red-blue trim. Players have also worn white uniforms with a red-blue diagonal or horizontal stripe over the years.

Coat of arms 
The club's emblem adopted by the club since the 1950s (and since then only modified from a graphic point of view, but never in substance) faithfully follows the heraldic coat of arms of the city of Sassari: a red and blue quartered shield, with a white tower drawn in the red quarters and an equally white cross in the blue ones.

Honours and distinctions

National competitions

Leagues
 Serie C1 (Tier 3):
 Third-place (1): 2005-06 Group B
 IV Serie / Serie C2 / Serie D (Tier 4):
 Winners (4): 1956-57 Group F, 1971-72 Group F, 1986-87 Group A, 1999-00 Group B
 Runners-up (3): 1954-55 Group F, 2015-16 Group G, 2019-20 Group G
 Third-place (1): 1982-83 Group A
 Serie D (Tier 5):
 Winners (3): 1980-81 Group D, 1992-93 Group F, 2012–13 Group G

Cups
 Coppa Cossu-Mariotti:
 Winners (1): 1976–77, 1977–78
 Coppa Italia Dilettanti (Interragional Phase):
 Winners (1): 1991-92
 Coppa Italia Serie D:
 Runners-up (1): 2021–22

Sardinian competitions

Leagues
 Prima Divisione / Eccellenza (Tier 1):
 Winners (3): 1949–50, 1950–51, 2011–12
 Runners-up (1): 2010-11 
 Third-place (2): 1951-52 Group I, 2017–18
 Promozione (Tier 2):
 Winners (1): 2008-09 Group B

Cups
 Sardinian Cup:
 Winners (1): 2011–12
 Sardinian Supercup:
 Winners (1): 2011–12

Friedlies trophies
 Campionati sardi di foot-ball:
 Winners (1): 1911
 Coppa Città de La Maddalena:
 Winners (1): 1912

Individual Player & Coach awards
Top Scorer
 Theofilos Karasavvidis Serie C1:1999-00 (19 gol)

Players

Current squad

Out on loan

Notable former players

League and cup history

{|class="wikitable"
|-bgcolor="#efefef"
! Season
! Div.
! Pos.
! Pl.
! W
! D
! L
! GS
! GA
! P
!Domestic Cup
!colspan=2|Other
!Notes
|-bgcolor=PowderBlue
|align=center|2018–19
|align=center|Serie D
|align=center|15
|align=center|38
|align=center|12
|align=center|4
|align=center|22
|align=center|35
|align=center|59
|align=center|40
|align=center|
|align=center|
|align=center|
|align=center|
|-bgcolor=PowderBlue
|align=center|2019–20
|align=center|Serie D
|align=center|3
|align=center|26
|align=center|14
|align=center|9
|align=center|3
|align=center|44
|align=center|25
|align=center|51
|align=center|
|align=center|
|align=center|
|align=center|
|-bgcolor=PowderBlue
|align=center|2020–21
|align=center|Serie D
|align=center|15
|align=center|34	
|align=center|8
|align=center|10
|align=center|16
|align=center|31
|align=center|48
|align=center|34
|align=center|
|align=center|
|align=center|
|align=center|
|-bgcolor=PowderBlue
|align=center|2021–22
|align=center|Serie D
|align=center|
|align=center|
|align=center|	 	
|align=center|
|align=center|
|align=center|
|align=center|
|align=center|
|  style="text-align:center; background:silver"|Finalist
|align=center|
|align=center|
|align=center|
|}

Women's team 
The women's team Torres Calcio Femminile has won six Serie A titles and eight Italian Women's Cups.

See also
 Torres Calcio Femminile
 U.S.D. Latte Dolce
 Dinamo Basket Sassari

References

External links 

 
 Historical Archives

 
Football clubs in Italy
Football clubs in Sardinia
Sassari
Association football clubs established in 1903
Serie C clubs
1903 establishments in Italy